Idiomela is a genus of medium-sized air-breathing land snails, terrestrial pulmonate gastropods in the family Helicidae, the typical snails.

Species
Species within the genus Idiomela include:
 Idiomela subplicata

References

 
Gastropod genera
Taxonomy articles created by Polbot